Ant-like beetle may refer to:

 Ant-like flower beetle, a family of beetles known to consume small arthropods, pollen, fungi, and whatever else they can find
 Ant-like leaf beetle, a family of beetles found on the undersides of the leaves of shrubs and trees
 Ant-like stone beetle, a family of beetles known to feed on oribatid mites

Animal common name disambiguation pages